Urine urea nitrogen (UUN) refers to a test that measures the urine urea to assess nitrogen balance.

Chemical structure 

Urea nitrogen is the end product of breakdown of proteins in the body. In individuals with normal kidney and liver functions, urea is excreted via urine.

Indication for testing 
By testing for UUN, clinicians can assess one's nitrogen balance. Calculating nitrogen balance is a useful tool in assessing adequacy of protein provision in clinical setting in:
 Patients with questionable protein intake.
 Patients with confirmed or suspected protein digestion and absorption problems.
 Patients with increased metabolic demand due to catabolic disease status.
 Patients on long-term enteral nutrition or parenteral nutrition.

Calculation of nitrogen balance 
UUN is determined from 24-hour urine collection. Along with UUN, values for BUN, protein content of diet, enteral or parenteral nutrition, and notable outputs other than urine (gastric residual, fistula output, drainages) are needed to calculate nitrogen balance.  Nitrogen Balance = Protein intake/6.25- (UN + 4*)  * For average loss via sweat and feces.

Interpretations 
 Nitrogen balance value of 0 indicates maintenance.
 If nitrogen balance is negative, nutrition intervention should address increased protein provision until equilibrium achieved.

When test is not appropriate 
As UUN test is based on 24-hour urine, in individuals with kidney disease with less than 1000 ml urine out/day or on dialysis, this test cannot be applied.

See also
 Blood urea nitrogen

References 
 Gerber GS, Brendler CB. Evaluation of the urologic patient: history, physical examination, and urinalysis. In: Wein AJ, Kavoussi LR, Novick AC, et al., eds. Campbell-Walsh Urology. 10th ed. Philadelphia, Pa: Elsevier Saunders; 2011:chap 3.
 McPherson RA, Ben-Ezra J. Basic examination of urine. In: McPherson RA, Pincus MR, eds. Henry’s Clinical Diagnosis and Management by Laboratory Methods. 22nd ed. Philadelphia, Pa: Elsevier Saunders; 2011:chap 28.
 William M Rand, Peter L Pellett, and Vernon R Young. Meta-analysis of nitrogen balance studies for estimating protein requirements in healthy adults. Am J Clin Nutr. 2003; 77(1): 109-127
 Hoffer L John. Protein and energy provision in critical illness. Am J Clin Nutr. 2003; 78: 906-911
 Frank N. Konstantinides. Nitrogen Balance Studies in Clinical Nutrition. Nutr Clin Pract. 1992; 7: 231-238

Urine tests